Virgin Creek is a small stream in Mendocino County, California north of Fort Bragg.

An old haul road, once used for logging and now a pedestrian and bicycle trail, crosses the creek on the west side of California State Route 1, and provides access to the beach at the mouth of the creek. Other beach activities include bird watching and tide pooling at low tide. However pets are not allowed, even on leashes.

References

Rivers of Mendocino County, California